Phorcysia  is a bacteria genus from the family Desulfurobacteriaceae.

References

Further reading 
 

Aquificota
Bacteria genera
Monotypic bacteria genera